Series 1900, 1900 series, or variant, may refer to:

 ICT 1900 series of mainframe computers
 Cisco 1900-series switch for computer networking
 Unimate 1900 series mechanical arm, first robotic arm for die casting
 Series 1900 dollar bills of the United States; see History of the United States dollar
 Series 1900 leu coins of Romania; see Coins of the Romanian leu

See also

 1900 world series of American baseball
 1900 (disambiguation)
 1900s (disambiguation)